Mound Township may refer to:

Mound Township, Effingham County, Illinois
Mound Township, McDonough County, Illinois
Mound Township, Warren County, Indiana
Mound Township, McPherson County, Kansas
Mound Township, Miami County, Kansas, in Miami County, Kansas
Mound Township, Phillips County, Kansas, in Phillips County, Kansas
Mound Township, Rock County, Minnesota
Mound Township, Bates County, Missouri
Mound Township, Slope County, North Dakota, in Slope County, North Dakota

Township name disambiguation pages